Nuhi Berisha (October 3, 1961 – January 19, 1984) was a Kosovo Albanian revolutionary and founder of the People's Movement of Kosovo.

Early life 
He was born in Kamenica, the son of Mehmet Berisha and Fahrije, in a traditional, patriotic family. He finished primary and eight-year school in his hometown, in Hogosht, while the family moved to Gjilan, when he enrolled in the Zenel Hajdini". He attended primary school in his hometown, secondary school in Gjilan, and the Faculty of Law and Physical Culture in Pristina. He was an excellent student. With the initiative of Rexhep Mala and other collaborators, he participated in the formation of the Student Committee within the Revolutionary Group, which served the Albanian Liberation Movement as the core of the Student Movement of 1981.

Revolution 
In 1973 they began Berisha and his friend Rexhep Mala publishing the Voice of Kosovo newspaper. In 1981, they formed a revolutionary group called Movement for an Albanian republic in Yugoslavia to Serve the Albanian Liberation Movement. Berisha attempted to lay the foundations for a liberation movement that would operate continuously.

Death 

In January 1984 Berisha and Mala were killed in Vranjevc by the Serbian police. Berisha and Mala are valued as two of the central figures of the resistance and the efforts of the Albanian people of Kosovo for freedom and independence. 

After they were killed, the group managed to wound a man from the secret police and plant a few small bombs.

References 

1961 births
1984 deaths
Kosovo Albanians
People from Kamenica, Kosovo
Albanian revolutionaries